Edmonton Riverview is a provincial electoral district in Alberta, Canada. The district is mandated to return a single member to the Legislative Assembly of Alberta using the first past the post method of voting.

Created in the 1997 boundary redistribution, the district includes re-distributed areas of the Edmonton-Glenora, Edmonton-Strathcona, and Edmonton-Whitemud.

Neighborhoods in this riding include: Windsor Park, Belgravia, Parkallen, Crestwood, Laurier Heights & Parkview.

Edmonton-Riverview remains one of the more affluent ridings in Edmonton, featuring some of the city's most expensive real estate.

The riding is currently represented by New Democrat Lori Sigurdson.

History
The electoral district was created in the 1996 boundary redistribution out of parts of Edmonton-Glenora and Edmonton-Strathcona.

The 2010 boundary redistribution saw the riding change on its western boundary with the boundary between Whitemud Drive and 87 Avenue moving west to run along 170 Street, in land that was part of Edmonton-Meadowlark. The northeast corner of the riding was also revised to have the boundary move along the right bank instead of the left bank of the North Saskatchewan River.

Boundary history

Electoral history

The first election held in 1997 saw Liberal candidate Linda Sloan elected as the first representative. Sloan defeated Progressive Conservative candidate Gwen Harris by over 900 votes. Sloan declined to seek a second term.

The 2001 election saw Liberal candidate and best-selling author Kevin Taft run against Progressive Conservative candidate and former Edmonton City Councilor Wendy Kinsella. Taft won almost half the popular vote earning 49% in the race.

Taft would later become leader of the Alberta Liberals he stood for a second term in office in the 2004 election. Taft easily defeated Progressive Conservative candidate and future MLA Fred Horne taking almost 65% of the vote.

He was re-elected again in 2008 and resigned his leadership position after the Progressive Conservatives made big gains at the Liberals expense throughout the province.

Legislature results

Elections in the 1990s

|}

Elections in the 2000s

|}

|}

Elections in the 2010s

Senate nominee results

2004 Senate nominee election district results

Voters had the option of selecting 4 Candidates on the Ballot

2012 Senate nominee election district results

Student Vote results

2004 election

On November 19, 2004 a Student Vote was conducted at participating Alberta schools to parallel the 2004 Alberta general election results. The vote was designed to educate students and simulate the electoral process for persons who have not yet reached the legal majority. The vote was conducted in 80 of the 83 provincial electoral districts with students voting for actual election candidates. Schools with a large student body that reside in another electoral district had the option to vote for candidates outside of the electoral district then where they were physically located.

References

External links 
Website of the Legislative Assembly of Alberta
Website of the Edmonton Riverview PC Association

Alberta provincial electoral districts
Politics of Edmonton